The Very Best of Richie is the second compilation album released by The Twelfth Man and was released in November 2015. Billy Birmingham says The Very Best of Richie is a tribute to Richie Benaud "the greatest commentator of them all" who died in April 2015.

The album peaked at number four on the ARIA Charts.

Reception
Dylan Marshall of The Music AU gave the album 7.5 out of 10 saying "It’s quite funny listening to the evolution of the Richie character. From the earliest material... it’s pretty obvious that the emphasis of The 12th Man’s material goes from being very match commentary-centric to then focusing on the interactions between the commentary team in later material" adding "All in all, The Very Best Of Richie truly is the very best: a classic catch."

Track listing
 "It's Just Not Cricket" - 5:24
 "Typical Stinkin'...." - 3:38
 "Bit Stuffy in Here" - 2:55
 "Chappell's to Open" - 4:49	
 "Australian v Pakistan" - 6:59
 "That's My Pen!" - 3:21
 "Brekky, and Carbide" - 3:26	
 "How about an Autograph?" - 2:47	
 "Post Hijack" - 11:20
 "The Lunch" - 5:58
 "Richie's Big Announcement" - 6:44	
 "The Office Update" - 4:05
 "Early Perth Flight" - 3:18
 "Chappelli's Shakespeare " - 2:31
 "Oh F..k It!" - 4:08
 "Hotel Check-In" - 8:14
 "Bill's Nose Job" - 6:22
 "Tony's Rug Advice" - 5:24
 "The Wrong Hair Hat!!" - 13:44
 "England v Sri Lanka" - 4:59
 "Alan Jones Radio Show" - 4:19
 "Martin Place Petition" - 3:13
 "Call the P.M.!!" - 9:35
 "Marvellous '06 (Horns Up!)" - 6:00
 "Henri Porte - Les Insects!" - 2:15	
 "Old Fossils / Bormy Ormy" - 5:06

Charts

Weekly charts

Year-end charts

Certifications

Release history

See also
 List of top 25 albums for 2015 in Australia

References

2015 compilation albums
Compilation albums by Australian artists
Cricket on the radio
The Twelfth Man albums
2010s comedy albums